Coliseo Héctor Solá Besares (English: Hector Sola Bezares Coliseum) is an indoor sporting arena located in Caguas, Puerto Rico. It is used mostly for basketball and was the home arena of Caguas Creoles of the National Superior Basketball league. The capacity of the arena is 10,000 spectators.
Also the Coliseo is the home ground for Criollas de Caguas volleyball team from Liga de Voleibol Superior Femenino.

The coliseum has also been the venue for major boxing fights, including some with Miguel Cotto and Ivan Calderon, and has been showcased on ESPN Friday Night Fights.

Its also known for holding the first World Wrestling Council wrestling card in 1973.

The coliseum sustained extensive damages as a result of Hurricane Maria on September 20, 2017.

References

External links
 Venue information

Caguas, Puerto Rico
Indoor arenas in Puerto Rico
Basketball venues in Puerto Rico
Volleyball venues in Puerto Rico